John Allen Burden (1862–1942) was an American Seventh-day Adventist minister, administrator, and medical missionary instrumental in founding sanitariums, restaurants, and health food factories. At the age of 9, John attended Adventist meetings for the first time and was introduced to the writings of Ellen G. White, which left a lifelong impression upon him. Five years later he was baptized, and at the age of 18 (1880) moved with his family to Oregon. John met Eleanor A. Baxter (1865–1933) as a student at Healdsburg College (now Pacific Union College). They were married in 1888 while working for the Rural Health Retreat (later St. Helena Sanitarium), of which John became manager in 1891.

In 1901 the Burdens went to Australia where they helped Merritt G. Kellogg who was founding the Wahroonga Sanitarium in Wahroonga, Sydney. By March 1904 the Burdens returned to the United States. Ellen G. White encouraged them not to unite with John Harvey Kellogg in Battle Creek, Michigan. Instead, John sought to establish a sanitarium near Los Angeles. Eight miles from the city he discovered the Glendale Hotel that had cost $60,000 to build in 1886. However, because of local business failures, property value had declined so that he was able to purchase it for $12,500. When it opened in 1905, Burden was the manager of the sanitarium, and Eleanor the bookkeeper. The sanitarium prospered under Burden's careful management.

In 1904 Ellen G. White urged for the establishment of another sanitarium in southern California. A resort hotel at Loma Linda was found that was available for $110,000, a price too high. On May 4, 1905 she met with the Burdens and others at the railroad station in Los Angeles on her way to the General Conference Session in Washington, D.C. Burden told her of the property, and she expressed definite interest in it, asking him to write her about it after his next visit to the property. When Burden's letter arrived in Washington, she urged him by telegram to

secure the property by all means. . . .  This is the very property we ought to have. Do not delay; for it is just what is needed.

Borrowing the down payment, Burden succeeded in purchasing the property for $40,000 and was put in charge of the new sanitarium. The final price, with discounts for early payment, came to $38,900. After Ellen White found out that the property was secured she wrote in her diary:

I am surprised more and more that the Lord has in His abundant mercy wrought in our behalf.

Founded as the College of Medical Evangelists, the institution exists today as Loma Linda University. A building on campus, Burden Hall, remains named for John Burden. At one time, it was home to the Loma Linda University Church of Seventh-day Adventists until the congregation outgrew it. Burden Hall now houses the Office of University Relations, is used for classes during the week, and is home to a Sabbath School class each Saturday.

Burden continued to manage the facilities at Loma Linda until 1915 when he became manager, and Eleanor the matron, of Paradise Valley Sanitarium (1916–1924; 1925–1934). After Eleanor's death in 1933, John retired, but in 1939 he returned to Loma Linda to serve as chaplain, counseling young medical missionaries and the staff of the College of Medical Evangelists. Burden died as the result of a car accident on his return from a Bible study in Redlands, California. Burden's personal collection of some 650 pages of Ellen White's letters (half of them addressed to him) was published as Loma Linda Messages (Loma Linda, CA: College of Medical Evangelists, 1934).

See also 

 Loma Linda University
 History of the Seventh-day Adventist Church
 Adventist
 Adventist Health Studies
 Seventh-day Adventist eschatology
 Seventh-day Adventist theology
 Seventh-day Adventist worship
 Prophecy in the Seventh-day Adventist Church
 Pillars
 Three Angels' Messages
 End times
 Sabbath in Seventh-day Adventism

References 

Pacific Union College alumni
1862 births
1942 deaths
Seventh-day Adventists in health science
Road incident deaths in California
American Seventh-day Adventists
Seventh-day Adventist religious workers
American Seventh-day Adventist ministers
Seventh-day Adventist administrators
American Seventh-day Adventist missionaries
History of the Seventh-day Adventist Church
Christian medical missionaries
Seventh-day Adventist missionaries in Australia
American expatriates in Australia